Barr's Hill School is a mixed secondary school and sixth form located in Radford, Coventry, England.

Location
Barr's Hill is situated on a spacious green field site just north of Coventry city centre on the B4098 (former A51), south of the Coventry-Nuneaton Line. The site of the former Daimler factory is a few hundred metres to the north. The Bablake School is directly to the west, separated by Naul's Mill Park. The school is outside of but borders the parish of Radford.
The school provides an extensive extended school's programme of classes and activities for the local community.

History

Grammar school
The area was heavily bombed in World War 2. It was an all-girls grammar school until 1975 when boys became pupils there for the first time. It was founded in 1908 with an intake of 180 girls, the original school building being the former house of John Kemp Starley, the inventor of the bicycle.

Comprehensive

It became a comprehensive in 1975. In 2006 the school gained specialist Engineering status and acts as a hub for the teaching of engineering in Coventry. Barr's Hill also gained foundation school status. In 2010 Applied Learning was added as a combined specialism.

Academy
Previously administered by Coventry City Council, in October 2015 Barr's Hill School was converted to academy status. The school is now part of the Futures Trust, however Barr's Hill continues to coordinate with Coventry City Council for admissions.

Academic performance
The progress made by students is among the best in Coventry. 44% of students gained 5 or more GCSEs at grades A*-C with English and Maths and 87% gained 5 or more A*-C grades overall in 2013. A-level results are amongst the best in the city.

Notable former pupils

Barr's Hill Grammar School

 Delia Derbyshire, composer and electronic musician most famous for producing the 1963 realisation of the theme music to science-fiction TV series Doctor Who, and associated with the BBC Radiophonic Workshop.
 Susan Hill, author of fiction and non-fiction. Novels include The Woman in Black, The Mist in the Mirror and I'm the King of the Castle for which she received the Somerset Maugham Award in 1971.
Sara Parkin, environmental activist 
Alison Rose, Principal of Newnham College Cambridge. Former British Ambassador to Belgium.
 Jennifer Page, former Chief Executive of the Millennium Dome project, sacked after a disastrous opening.
 Jane A. Langdale, Professor of Plant Sciences at the University of Oxford
 Ann Moss, Professor of French, Durham University 
 Julianne Regan singer/songwriter. Lecturer at Bath Spa University.
Rosalind Ridley, Neuropsychologist, Cambridge University (retired)

Barr's Hill School
 Trish Adudu, a British freelance journalist, television presenter and DJ.

References

External links
 EduBase

Secondary schools in Coventry
Educational institutions established in 1908
1908 establishments in England
Academies in Coventry
Specialist engineering colleges in England